Liberty Square may refer to:
Azadi Square, Tehran (Azadi in Persian means liberty)
Liberty Square, Aleppo
Liberty Square (Budapest)
Liberty Square (Taipei)
Liberty Square (Tolyatti)
Liberty Square (Miami), a public housing project in Miami, Florida, United States
Liberty Square (Magic Kingdom), one of the "lands" in the Magic Kingdom theme park of Walt Disney World Resort
 Liberty Square (album)

See also
Freedom Square (disambiguation)
Zuccotti Park, which was informally renamed "Liberty Square" during the Occupy Wall Street protests